Elamkulam P. N. Kunjan Pillai (8 November 1904 – 4 March 1973), known as Elamkulam, was an Indian historian, linguist and academic from southern Kerala, India. He was a pioneering scholar of southern Indian history, Kerala history, in particular. Although only holding academic degrees in Sanskrit and Malayalam, and having no formal training as a historian, Elamkulam is considered one of the pioneers of modern Kerala historiography.

He was one of the major proponents of the unitary/imperial state model in medieval Kerala history. The Elamkulam model of a highly centralised "empire" (unitary/Imperial state model) in medieval Kerala is now considered not acceptable by south Indian historians. Majority of Elamkulam's works are written in Malayalam, with a few in Tamil and English.

He was well versed in Kannada, Tulu (largest nonliterary South Dravidian language) and Pali (language of the Theravada Buddhist canon) also. He was also considered one of the top authorities in Vattezhuthu script and Old/Early Malayalam language.

Elamkulam associated himself for some time with Mortimer Wheeler in the excavation works at Harappa, Chandravally, and Brahmagiri. He is also known for informally guiding M. G. S. Narayanan, a research scholar in University of Kerala in early 1970s.

Life and career
Born in Elamkulam village near Kalluvathukkal in Travancore, Kunjan Pillai had his school education at Trivandrum and Quilon. After taking his honours degree in Sanskrit language from Annamalai University, he started his career as a school teacher and later became lecturer in Malayalam at Government Arts College, Trivandrum. Elamkulam retired as the Head of the Department of Malayalam, University College, Trivandrum.

Elamkulam published most his research findings only in his later years. He published more than 20 books, in Malayalam, including one in Tamil and two in English. Some of his theories regarding early Kerala history have been challenged by later researchers in the light of new evidence.

Pillai died on 4 March 1973. Kanjiracode Valiaveettil Bhargavi Amma was his wife. The couple had five children.

Unitary/Imperial state model 
Elamkulam had studied comprehensively Old/Early Malayalam - Vatteluttu inscriptions from the ninth century CE, and with the help of literary texts, claimed they belonged to a single line of kings ("the Kulasekharas") that ruled Kerala from Kodungallur. He had challenged the very foundations of the then existing William Logan-K. P. Padmanabha Menon construction of Kerala history. He proposed a unitary or imperial state model, emphasising centralised administration, for the Kulasekhara kingdom.

The Elamkulam version of historiography had believed that this "Second Chera Empire", or "Kulasekhara Empire" was a highly centralised kingdom. However, critical research in the late 1960s and early 1970s by offered a major corrective to this. Recently (2002), suggestions pointing to the other extreme, that the king at Kodungallur had only a "ritual sovereignty" and the actual political power rested with "a bold and visible Brahmin oligarchy" has emerged.

The nature of the Kodungallur Chera/Kulasekhara state is an ongoing academic debate. While the Elamkulam model of a highly centralised "empire" is considered not acceptable by south Indian historians, the third model (2002) is yet to be endorsed by them.

Selected works

In Malayalam
Unnuneeli Sandesam
Koka Sandesam
Leelathlakam
Chandrolsavam
Unnuneeli Sandesam Charithradrishtiyilkoodi
Nalachritham Attakkatha
Gandhidevan
Keralabhashayude Vikasaparinamangal
Bhashayum Sahityavum Noottandukalil
Sahityamalika
108 Shivalaya Sothram
Sahityacharithrasamgraham
Keralacharithrathile Iruldanja Edukal
Annathe Keralam
Chila Kerala Charithra Prasnangal (Part I, II, & III)
Janmi samprdayam Keralathil
Keralam  Anchum Arum Noottandukalil
Cherasamrajyam  Ompathum Pathum Noottandukalil
Samskarathinte Nazhikakkallukal

In English
Studies in Kerala History
Some Problems in Kerala History

In Tamil
Pandai Keralam

References

1904 births
1973 deaths
20th-century Indian historians
Malayalam-language writers
Writers from Kollam
Academic staff of the University College Thiruvananthapuram
Annamalai University alumni
Historians of India
Writers from Kerala
Indian male essayists
20th-century Indian essayists
Historians of Kerala